Gregory Clark,  (25 September 1892 – 3 February 1977) was a Canadian war veteran, journalist, and humourist.

In 1967, he was made one of the initial Officers of the Order of Canada "for the humour which he has brought to his profession as a newspaper writer and radio commentator".

Major Gregory Clark is buried in Mount Pleasant Cemetery.

Early life
Clark was born and raised in Toronto, and attended high school at Harbord Collegiate Institute. After twice failing his first year studies at the University of Toronto, in 1911 Clark joined the editorial staff of The Toronto Star, where his father Joseph worked as an editor. Clark would work at the Star for the next 36 years, interrupted only by military service in World War I, from 1916 through 1918.

Surviving three years in the trenches of World War I, Clark returned to Canada in 1918 a major with the 4th Canadian Mounted Rifles having been awarded the Military Cross for conspicuous gallantry at Vimy Ridge. After the Armistice, Clark returned to his job as a newspaper reporter.

In the 1920s and 1930s, Clark became one of the Toronto Star's best known reporters and columnists. He worked alongside a young Ernest Hemingway in the Star newsroom. Although Clark was initially suspicious of the "tall young squirt" who showed up in his office in 1920, the two became friends. Clark urged Hemingway to give up on trying to write fiction and concentrate his efforts on journalism "where his true talent -- and his brilliant future -- lay". Clark later cheerfully admitted that Hemingway made the right move by completely ignoring his advice.
 
As a reporter, Clark covered (among many other stories) the Great Haileybury Fire of 1922, the Lindbergh Kidnap Trial in 1935, and the coronation of King George VI and the royal couple's 1939 tour of Canada. However, perhaps Clark's most celebrated piece of reportage the surrounded his coverage of the Moose River Mine Disaster of 1936. After having arrived in Nova Scotia to cover the story, Clark continued to stay with the rescue crew after many other reporters had left, as they had given up hope the trapped miners were still alive. Clark was therefore on hand when the first faint taps of the trapped miners were heard, and was able to report the scoop first-hand.

In addition to his work as a reporter, Clark penned a regular column.  Usually lightly humorous in tone, Clark's columns were closely observed real-life vignettes that would tell stories of everyday trials, tribulations, and minor triumphs. An avid outdoorsman and conservationist, Clark's columns often detailed adventures he and his friends had while on (or preparing for) a fishing or hunting trip. By the late 1930s, Clark's columns, illustrated by Jimmie Frise, were so popular in Canada that Star editor Charles Lymbery averred that more Canadians would recognize Clark on the street than they would the prime minister, a member of the royal family or a Hollywood movie star. A selection of Clark's columns and Frise's illustrations appeared in a volume titled So What in 1936. Frise talked of their blunderings to the Star: "We've fried eggs on the city hall steps. We caulked my house and flooded the parlor with cement. I once let Greg persuade me to get a steam shovel to do my spring digging and ruined my garden. Perhaps this book is our most foolish adventure."  A follow-up volume, Which We Did, appeared in 1937.

Clark in World War II
Too old for active service, in World War II, Greg Clark returned to the battlefield as a reporter. To his peers  he was the Dean of Canadian War Correspondents. Clark reported on the German Blitzkrieg from France in 1940, on Dunkirk and Dieppe from England, and on the Italian and North-West Europe campaigns from the Front. He was awarded the OBE for his service as a war correspondent.

Post WWII
Returning to the Star at the war's conclusion, both Frise and Clark became unhappy with the Stars treatment of its staff, and made an agreement in 1946 to leave at the first opportunity. Clark's having been denied leave by the Star after the death of his first son, Murray Clark, may have been a factor in this decision. Clark contacted John McConnell, publisher of the Montreal Standard, a newspaper with a smaller circulation than the Star that had earlier offered him a position. McConnell offered the pair salaries similar to what they received at the Star, as well as the opportunity for Frise to have his comic strip syndicated in the United States, which would supplement his income. The pair left the Star in December.
      
Clark and Frise continued to work together as a writer/illustrator team for the Standard, beginning in early 1947. However, after feeling unwell the night before, Frise died of a heart attack in his home in Toronto on 13 June 1948, at age 57.

Clark continued as a syndicated columnist for the rest of his life. Frise was briefly replaced as illustrator by Duncan Macpherson, but this did not last long, and Clark did not work with another illustrator after parting ways with Macpherson circa 1950.

In 1951, the Standard was changed to a magazine format and relaunched as Weekend Picture Magazine (later Weekend)  that was distributed across Canada as a weekend supplement to local newspapers. While continuing his weekend column for Weekend Picture Magazine, around the same time Clark began to write a daily column called "Gregory Clark's Packsack", which was published in numerous Canadian newspapers throughout the 1950s and 60s. The Packsack columns tended to be a miscellany of observations, musings, anecdotes and remembrances, and ran for 17 years until Clark's health forced him to curtail his writing activities.  Clark's weekend column (usually titled "Greg Clark Tells About...") was in the form of a personal story, always starring Greg and often featuring his minor misadventures and mishaps with various (usually fictionalized) companions, such as his extremely frugal neighbour Dandy Daniels or his various fishing buddies.  These stories were published in the Weekend magazine supplement right into the mid-1970s.

After a long layoff from book publishing, Clark was persuaded to issue the collection The Best of Gregory Clark (1959), which consisted of an editor's selection of Clark's best Weekend pieces from the 1950s. It was successful enough to merit a series of sequels, beginning with Greg's Choice (1961) a selection of Clark's own personal favourite Weekend columns. Collections of Clark's columns thereafter appeared regularly, usually every year or two, for the rest of his life.

For the most part, Clark's Weekend columns were humorous pieces about hunting and fishing or family life, although they also sometimes discussed his experiences in both World Wars—and after. One of his more famous columns, "One Block of Howland Avenue", describes how Clark's elderly father asked his two decorated veteran sons never to walk up the street past the neighbours to their house at 66 Howland Avenue again. All the young men of the Howland block had died in World War I, except Greg and his brother Joseph. Clark's father tried to balance his pride and joy at having both sons back home with his grief and concern for his neighbours and friends, who might be looking out their windows.

Though he was probably Canada's most honoured journalist, an initiate Officer of the Order of Canada, and decorated as both a fighting soldier and as a war correspondent, Clark's work is currently out of print.

Biography
In 1981, The Life and Times of Gregory Clark, Canada's Favorite Storyteller, by fellow journalist Jock Carroll, was published by Doubleday.

Quotes
 "A sportsman is one who not only will not show his own father where the best fishing holes are but will deliberately direct him to the wrong ones." —from a speech to the Empire Club of Canada in 1950

Books

Collected essays and newspaper columns
Which We Did, R. Saunders (1936)
So What?, R. Saunders (1937)
The Best of Gregory Clark, Ryerson Press (1959)
Greg's Choice, Ryerson Press (1961)
Hi, There!, Ryerson Press (1963)
War Stories, Ryerson Press (1964), winner of the Stephen Leacock Award for Humour in 1965
May Your First Love be Your Last, McClelland and Stewart (1969)
A Bar'l of Apples: a Gregory Clark Omnibus, McGraw-Hill Ryerson (1971)
Outdoors with Gregory Clark, McClelland and Stewart (1971)
The Bird of Promise, McClelland and Stewart (1973)
Grandma Preferred Steak, (1974)
Fishing with Gregory Clark, Prentice-Hall of Canada (1975)
Things That Go Squeak In The Night, Prentice-Hall (1976)
The Best of Greg Clark and Jimmie Frise, Collins (1977)
Silver Linings, Collins (1978)
Greg Clark and Jimmie Frise Outdoors, Collins (1979)
Ten Cents Off Per Dozen: A Gregory Clark Omnibus, Optimum (1979)
A Supersonic Day (from the Packsack of Gregory Clark), McClelland and Stewart (1980)
Greg Clark and Jimmie Frise Go Fishing, Collins (1980)

Other
With Rod and Reel in Canada, Canadian Government Travel Bureau (1947)

As a contributor
The Face of Canada, Clarke, Irwin & Company (1959)

References

External links
 Greg Clark at The Canadian Encyclopedia
 Canadian Great War Project CEF Soldier Detail Major Gregory Clark  
 Mount Pleasant biography 
 a speech by Gregory Clark, Canadian humorist, sportsman, and veteran at the Empire Club of Canada in 1950
 Canadian newspapers and the Second World War
 Library and Archives Canada description of Gregory Clark fonds: "0.72 metres of textual records, 22 photographs and 2 sound recordings. This material contains personal diaries, fishing journals and correspondence documenting Clark's 60-year career...."

1892 births
1977 deaths
Burials at Mount Pleasant Cemetery, Toronto
Canadian military personnel of World War I
Canadian Army officers
Military personnel from Toronto
Canadian Expeditionary Force officers
Canadian male journalists
Journalists from Toronto
Members of the United Church of Canada
Canadian Officers of the Order of the British Empire
Officers of the Order of Canada
Canadian recipients of the Military Cross
Toronto Star people
Stephen Leacock Award winners
People from Old Toronto